Thelenella muscorum is a species of lichen belonging to the family Thelenellaceae.

References

Lecanoromycetes
Lichen species
Taxa named by Theodor Magnus Fries
Lichens described in 1860